The National Wrestling Association (NWA) World Middleweight Championship was a professional wrestling title sanctioned by the National Wrestling Association, an offshoot of the National Boxing Association (NBA). The title existed from 1928 through 1940, and is said to have connecting lineage to what would become the National Wrestling Alliance's World Middleweight Championship.

Title history

Footnotes

References

National Wrestling Association championships
Middleweight wrestling championships